Ilektra Elli Efthymiou (Ηλέκτρα-Ελλί Ευθυμίου; born 24 June 1989) is a Greek group rhythmic gymnast. She represents her nation at international competitions.

She participated at the 2004 Summer Olympics in the group all-around event finishing 5th in the final after finishing 4th in the qualification. She competed at world championships, including at the 2005 World Rhythmic Gymnastics Championships.

References

External links
https://database.fig-gymnastics.com/public/gymnasts/biography/2643/true?backUrl=%2Fpublic%2Fresults%2Fdisplay%2F14883%3FidAgeCategory%3D8%26idCategory%3D78%23anchor_84473
http://news.bbc.co.uk/sport2/hi/olympics_2004/gymnastics/results/3531336.stm
http://olympstats.com/wp-content/uploads/2016/07/Rhythmic-Gymnastics-Lists.pdf

1989 births
Living people
Greek rhythmic gymnasts
Place of birth missing (living people)
Olympic gymnasts of Greece
Gymnasts at the 2004 Summer Olympics